José Manuel Ortega Heredia (Madrid, 7 February 1956 - Alhaurín de la Torre, Málaga, 5 December 2004) was a Spanish singer and guitarist.
 
In 1978, with producer José Luis de Carlos, he recorded his first solo album, Poco ruido y mucho duende, in a very personal style with flamenco nuances. The theme Verde, adapted from a poem by Lorca, was a great success. In 1980, he recorded his second LP Espíritu sin nombre with the palmero Daniel Barba de las Arenas. With his third album, in 1981, Talco y bronce, he surpassed half a million copies in Spain with the singles Un ramito de violetas and Por tu ausencia. They were followed by Cuando la noche te envuelve (1982), La quiero a morir (1983) and Mal de amores (1984).

In 1986, he released Echando sentencias, including Arab and Indian instruments. In 1988 he launched En voz baja a las rosas, with adaptations of Sor Juana Ines de la Cruz, Góngora and Lorca. In 1993 he made testimony to his faith in the album Quédate con Cristo. After a long silence, in which he only sang for the Evangelical Church, he returned in 1998 with the album Por tu ausencia, a live recording of greatest hits and new songs that became a gold record. In 1999 he repeated the gold record with the soundtrack of the film Sobreviviré.

In 2000 he recorded Dímelo, a new gold record, and in 2002 Gitano cubano, accompanied by Raimundo Amador, Lolita and Cuban singers Lucrecia and David Montes.

In 2004 he died in his house as a result of a heart attack.

Albums
 Poco ruido y mucho duende (CBS, 1978)
 Espíritu sin nombre (CBS, 1980)
 Talco y bronce (CBS, 1981)
 Cuando la noche te envuelve (CBS, 1982)
 La quiero a morir (CBS, 1983)
 Mal de amores (CBS, 1984)
 Echando sentencias (RCA, 1986)
 En voz baja a las rosas (RCA, 1988)
 Quédate con Cristo (Horus, 1993)
 Por tu ausencia (WEA, 1998) live
 Dímelo (WEA, 2000)
 Gitano cubano (WEA, 2002)
 La cucharita (CDI, 2004)

References

1956 births
2004 deaths
21st-century Spanish male singers
21st-century Spanish singers
People from the Province of Málaga
Place of death missing
20th-century Spanish male singers
20th-century Spanish singers
Spanish male guitarists